Marcelo Martínez (born 2 June 1960) is an Argentine alpine skier. He competed in two events at the 1980 Winter Olympics.

References

1960 births
Living people
Argentine male alpine skiers
Olympic alpine skiers of Argentina
Alpine skiers at the 1980 Winter Olympics
Sportspeople from Bariloche